Sector 3 is an administrative unit of Bucharest. It is the most populous, most densely populated and also the third-largest division of the city. Actually, at its total population of over 460 thousand, it is the second-most populated administrative area of Romania, only after the capital city. It is also the most important of all six sectors of Bucharest, as it includes the Downtown Bucharest, the Kilometre Zero and other significant landmarks. It is bordered by Sector 2 to the North, Ilfov County to the East, Sector 4 to the South, Sector 5 to the Southwest, and Sector 1 to the Northwest.

The largest and most populous district of Sector 3 is Titan. Lipscani, colloquially known as oldtown is the center of the nightlife in Bucharest, and also the biggest attraction for foreign tourists. Also notable, the Bucharest Mall is located inside the Vitan district of Sector 3. Two of the sector's districts have been described as the most pleasant by Bucharest citizens.

Districts 
 Downtown
 Old City
 Dristor
 Dudești
 Văcărești
 Titan
 Vitan

Transportation
Sector 3, being the largest division of Bucharest is served by the largest part of its public transport company. The sector is served by over 50 bus lines and 14 trolleybus lines. The sector is also served by a wide light rail system.

Trolleybus routes 70 and 92 as well as tram routes 40 and 56 are the only routes operating exclusively inside the sector.

The sector is also served by the Bucharest Metro. A total of 13 stations are placed within its districts. The oldest and busiest station of the system is Union Square, while the newest one is Policolor. Other major underground hubs located in Sector 3 include Dristor, Titan and University.

The Sun Motorway which links the city to Constanța also starts from this sector. There is also a CFR train station located in the sector, the commuter station Titan Sud.

Education
The sector is home to more than fifty kindergartens, school and public high schools as well as the Hyperion Private University. The most prestigious high schools in the sector are the Matei Basarab National College, situated in Downtown Bucharest and the Alexandru Ioan Cuza Theoretical High School, situated in Titan.

Politics 

Robert Negoiță, a former member of the Social Democratic Party (PSD) until 2020 has been the sector's mayor since 2012. He is currently serving his third term, having been re-elected in 2016 and 2020. The Local Council of Sector 3 has 31 seats, with the following party composition (as of 2020):

Demographics 

With a population of 393,226 people based on a July 2005 estimate, Sector 3 is the most populous sector in Bucharest. According to the 2002 census, 97.29% of the sector's population is Romanian, while 1.31% are Romani, 0.29% are Hungarian, and 0.15% are Turkish. In terms of gender, 53.6% of the population is female, while 46.4% is male.

See also
 Apartment Building 63

References

External links

 List of local councillors for Sector 3 (Microsoft Word document)

Sectors of Bucharest